Davidson County is a county located in the U.S. state of North Carolina. As of the 2020 census, the population was 168,930. Its county seat is Lexington, and its largest city is Thomasville.

Davidson County is included in the Winston-Salem, NC Metropolitan Statistical Area, which is also included in the Greensboro-Winston-Salem-High Point, NC Combined Statistical Area.

Parts of Davidson County are in the Yadkin Valley wine region.

History
The original North Carolina county of this name was created in 1786 what was then the far western portion of North Carolina, with its county seat at Nashville and a territory covering most of what is now Middle Tennessee.  When Tennessee was established as a separate state in 1796, this county became Davidson County, Tennessee.

The current North Carolina county was formed in 1822 from Rowan County.  It was named after Brigadier General William Lee Davidson, an American Revolutionary War general killed at the Battle of Cowan's Ford on the Catawba River in 1781.

In 1911, a new county called Piedmont County was proposed, with High Point as its county seat, to be created from Guilford, Davidson and Randolph Counties.  Many people appeared at the Guilford County courthouse to oppose the plan, vowing to go to the state legislature to protest. The state legislature voted down the plan in February 1911.

Geography

Davidson County is located entirely within the Piedmont region of central North Carolina. The Piedmont consists of gently rolling terrain frequently broken by hills or shallow valleys formed by rivers and streams. An exception to this terrain are the Uwharrie Mountains in the county's western and southwestern sections. The highest point in the Uwharries - and the highest point in Davidson County - is High Rock Mountain in the county's southwestern corner.

National protected area
 Uwharrie National Forest (part)

State and local protected areas 
 Boone's Cave Park
 Lake Thom-A-Lex Park

Major water bodies 
 Abbotts Creek
 Badin Lake
 High Rock Lake
 Lake Thom-A-Lex
 Tuckertown Reservoir
 Yadkin River

Adjacent counties
 Forsyth County - north
 Guilford County - northeast
 Randolph County - east
 Montgomery County - south
 Stanly County - southwest
 Rowan County - southwest
 Davie County - west

Major highways

Major infrastructure
 Davidson County Airport
 Lexington Station

Demographics

2020 census

As of the 2020 United States census, there were 168,930 people, 69,938 households, and 49,037 families residing in the county.

2010 census
As of the census of 2010, there were 149,331 people, 58,156 households, and 42,512 families residing in the county.  The population density was 267 people per square mile (103/km2).  There were 62,432 housing units at an average density of 113 per square mile (44/km2).  The racial makeup of the county was 84.05% White, 11.14% Black or African American, 0.37% Native American, 0.82% Asian, 0.01% Pacific Islander, 1.66% from other races, and 0.94% from two or more races.  3.24% of the population were Hispanic or Latino of any race.

There were 58,156 households, out of which 32.70% had children under the age of 18 living with them, 58.00% were married couples living together, 10.80% had a female householder with no husband present, and 26.90% were non-families. 22.90% of all households were made up of individuals, and 8.80% had someone living alone who was 65 years of age or older.  The average household size was 2.50 and the average family size was 2.92.

In the county, the population was spread out, with 24.30% under the age of 18, 7.60% from 18 to 24, 31.20% from 25 to 44, 24.10% from 45 to 64, and 12.80% who were 65 years of age or older.  The median age was 37 years. For every 100 females there were 96.00 males.  For every 100 females age 18 and over, there were 93.70 males.

The median income for a household in the county was $38,640, and the median income for a family was $46,241. Males had a median income of $31,287 versus $23,622 for females. The per capita income for the county was $18,703.  About 7.00% of families and 10.10% of the population were below the poverty line, including 13.30% of people under age 18 and 12.10% of those age 65 or over.

Government and politics
Davidson County was one of the first areas of North Carolina to turn Republican, doing so long before other areas of conservative white voters shifted away from the Democrats. No Democratic presidential nominee has carried the county since Franklin D. Roosevelt defeated Thomas E. Dewey by a mere ten votes out of almost 19,000 in 1944. It was one of only 13 counties out of 100 in the state to vote for Barry Goldwater over Lyndon Johnson in 1964, and the last Democrat to garner even one-third of the county's vote was Jimmy Carter in 1980.

Davidson County is a member of the regional Piedmont Triad Council of Governments.

Davidson County gained national attention when Gerald Hege, Sheriff from 1994–2003, became a minor celebrity for his unconventional prisoner treatment methods.

Education
Davidson County is served by Davidson County Schools; however, the cities of Thomasville and Lexington have their own school districts. Davidson County Schools is one of the county's largest employers.

Davidson County is also served by Davidson-Davie Community College, a comprehensive community college that is a member school of the North Carolina Community College System.  Davidson-Davie Community College was chartered in 1958 as an Industrial Education Center designed to provide adults with the education and skills needed to move from an agricultural to a manufacturing-based economy.

In 1965, the institution was chartered as Davidson County Community College. The Associate in Arts and Associate in Science degrees were added to the existing Associate in Applied Science degree, Diploma, and Certificate programs. University transfer courses were added in 1966. In 1997, the College participated in the Comprehensive Articulation Agreement (CAA) that allows college transfer students to move easily to the 16 UNC schools, as well as many independent college and universities.

Attractions

Festivals
One of the county's most famous attractions is the yearly Lexington Barbecue Festival,  held in the city of Lexington during the month of October, bringing in over 100,000 visitors from all over the southeastern U.S. There is also a yearly Davidson County Agriculture Fair held in September. Thomasville hosts an annual "Everybody's Day Festival",  the longest running festival in the state. The "Southeastern Old Threshers Reunion" is held every year at the Denton Farmpark.

Landmarks
There are many year-long attractions in Davidson County. Some of which include Historic Uptown Lexington, which consists of the Davidson County Historical Museum located in the old courthouse. Along side the Yadkin River sits Boone's Cave Park where according to legend, a young Daniel Boone and his family once lived. Other attractions include Denton Farm Park, Walter Johnson Camp and Conference Center, and the North Carolina Vietnam Veterans Memorial. The historic Wil-Cox Bridge spanning the Yadkin River has been preserved for pedestrian traffic and is now part of the Yadkin River Park. The Big Chair in Thomasville is also a major landmark.

Art
 Pigs in the City is an art initiative held each summer in Lexington, and attracts tens of thousands of visitors.

In 2005, Davidson County Community College and the City of Thomasville formed a partnership for the creation of the Thomasville Artisan Center.  This art studio allowed the College to reinvigorate its Associate in Fine Arts Degree and offer both university transfer classes as well as adult community interest classes in painting, drawing, and sculpting.  The Artisan Center is part of the College's Thomasville Education Center complex which is part of the College's outreach to the community.  The College has a second campus in Davie County in the city of Mocksville, as well as the Uptown Lexington Education Center, located within a few blocks of the Arts Center of Davidson County and the historic Court House.

Barbecue

One of the two major styles of North Carolina barbecue originated in Lexington, the county seat and home to the annual Lexington Barbecue Festival.  Therefore, many Lexington-style barbecue restaurants are found throughout the county. Some include Lexington BBQ ("Honeymonk's"), The BBQ Center, Jimmy's (closed and torn down in 2016), Whitley's BBQ Restaurant, Smokey Joe's, Backcountry, Speedy's, Smiley's, Tarheel Q, Stamey's, Kerley's, Rick's  BBQ, and Cook's.

Richard Childress
Davidson County is home to many supporting race fans and the famous Richard Childress.  It includes his personal Childress Vineyards and Richard Childress Racing Museum.

The Big Chair
Davidson County is also known for its oversized chair, "The Big Chair."  This chair is located in central Thomasville and is a symbol of Davidson County's furniture industry.

High Rock Lake

High Rock Lake is the northernmost of the Uwharrie Lakes and the second largest lake in North Carolina behind Lake Norman. It begins at the confluence of the Yadkin River and the South Yadkin River. It has been the host of the Bassmaster Classic in 1994, 1995 and 1998. and is the site of frequent other local angling competitions. Lexington is just north of the Abbotts Creek section of the lake.

Communities

Cities
 High Point (part)
 Lexington (county seat)
 Thomasville (largest city)

Towns
 Denton
 Midway
 Wallburg

Townships

 Abbotts Creek
 Alleghany
 Arcadia
 Boone
 Conrad Hill
 Cotton Grove
 Emmons
 Hampton
 Healing Spring
 Jackson Hill
 Lexington
 Midway
 Reedy Creek
 Silver Hill
 Thomasville
 Tyro
 Yadkin College

 Wallburg

Census-designated places
 Southmont
 Tyro
 Welcome

Unincorporated communities
 Arcadia
 Churchland
 Gordontown
 Holly Grove
 Reeds
 Silver Hill
 Silver Valley
 Welcome
 Yadkin College

Notable people
 Nia Franklin – Miss America 2019
 Wilmer "Vinegar Bend" Mizell- Professional Baseball player for the Pirates and Cardinals, and a Congressman who served three terms. (1930–1999)
 Max Lanier and son Hal Lanier, both Major League Baseball players are from Denton.
 Eddie Mathews, Hall of Fame baseball player, played for Thomasville in 1949 before going
 Perry Tuttle – Former NFL & CFL wide receiver.
 Shy Tuttle – Defensive tackle for the New Orleans Saints

See also
 List of counties in North Carolina
 National Register of Historic Places listings in Davidson County, North Carolina
 List of national forests of the United States

References

External links

 
 

 
1822 establishments in North Carolina
Populated places established in 1822